The 2008 FIFA Club World Cup final was the final match of the 2008 FIFA Club World Cup, an association football tournament for the champion clubs from each of FIFA's six continental confederations. The match took place at the International Stadium Yokohama, Japan, on 21 December 2008, and pitted LDU Quito of Ecuador, the CONMEBOL club champions, and Manchester United of England, the UEFA club champions. Despite going down to ten men early in the second half, Manchester United won the match 1–0 thanks to a 73rd-minute goal from Wayne Rooney.

Road to final
Both Manchester United and LDU Quito qualified for the competition at the semi-final stage, after winning their respective continental competition, the 2007–08 UEFA Champions League and the 2008 Copa Libertadores.

LDU Quito's opening game was against Mexican side Pachuca, who had defeated Egyptian club Al Ahly 4–2 in the quarter-finals after extra time. Their semi-final match was played at the National Stadium in Tokyo on 17 December 2008. LDU Quito scored two goals in the first 26 minutes, through Claudio Bieler and Luis Bolaños, securing a place in the Club World Cup final.

Manchester United's semi-final opponents were Gamba Osaka, who had previously defeated Australian A-League premiers and Asian Champions League runners-up Adelaide United (1–0) to move into the second semi-final on 18 December. Nemanja Vidić and Cristiano Ronaldo opened the scoring in the first half, putting Manchester United ahead by two goals at half time. Masato Yamazaki was the next to score, in the 74th minute, to bring Gamba back into the competition, but Wayne Rooney scored twice and Darren Fletcher once within the next five minutes to extend United's lead. Yasuhito Endō converted an 85th-minute penalty kick and Hideo Hashimoto got a third for Gamba just minutes before the final whistle. The result was 5–3, taking Manchester United to the final.

Match

Details

Statistics

See also
Manchester United F.C. in European football

References

External links
FIFA Club World Cup Japan 2008, FIFA.com
Technical Report and Statistics (PDF), FIFA.com

World
Final
L.D.U. Quito matches
Manchester United F.C. matches
2008
2008 in Ecuadorian football
Sports competitions in Yokohama
2000s in Yokohama